Dudleya cymosa subsp. cymosa  is a species of succulent perennial plant in the family Crassulaceae native to California. It is the autonymous subspecies for Dudleya cymosa, and is known by the common name canyon liveforever. It is native to the California Coast Ranges, the Sierra Nevada and the Santa Monica Mountains. It is characterized by bright-yellow, orange or red flowers and broad, wide leaves. This plant is commonly found growing on rocky outcrops, talus slopes, and in shaded canyons.

Description 
A solitary or few-branched rosette forming succulent with broad leaves and bright-yellow, orange, or red flowers.

Vegetative morphology 
Each basal rosette is formed on the apex of a stem, known as a caudex. The caudex is short, usually less than 5 cm long, and is 1 to 3.5 cm in diameter. It is typically unbranched, forming a solitary rosette, but may less commonly branch into a few rosettes. Each of the basal rosette is 6 to 20 cm in diameter, composed of 6 to 25 leaves. The leaves are typically 3 to 17 cm long, 10 to 60 mm wide, and 1 to 5 mm thick. The leaves are shaped ovate or deltate to oblanceolate or spatulate (shaped like a spoon). The margin (edge) of the leaves is often folded upward at the widest point, and the tip of the leaf is more or less recurved and is shaped acuminate to mucronate.

Reproductive morphology 

The inflorescence is typically asymmetrical radially, because the pedicels turn to the sun or away from the cliff the plant is on. The peduncle (floral stem) is 5 to 45 cm tall, 2 to 8 mm wide, and ascending. On the inflorescence are 7 to 20 bracts, positioned horizontally to ascending, and shaped ovate to triangular-lanceolate, with the tips acute to acuminate. The lowermost bracts are 0.5 to 3 cm long and 5 to 15 mm wide. The inflorescence branches 2 to 4 times, and then may subsequently branch 0 to 3 times. The terminal branches are circinate when young (spiral-shaped, like a fern frond unfurling), but are ascending in age, 1 to 17 cm long and with 2 to 10 flowers. Suspending the flowers are the pedicels, which are erect, the lowermost 5 to 15 mm long.

The calyx of the flowers is 3 to 7 mm long, and 2.5 to 6 mm wide. The calyx lobes (equivalent to sepals) are triangular to triangular ovate, 1.5 to 5 mm long. The corolla is cylindrical in anthesis, with the tips of the petals spreading from 45 to 90 degree angles. The petals are colored yellow, orange, or red, and may be glaucous along their midrib. The petals are shaped elliptic to narrowly lanceolate, with an acute tip, 7 to 15 mm long and 2 to 4 mm wide, connate (fused to form a tube) 1 to 2.5 mm.

Taxonomy

Taxonomic history 
The original description is from 1858 by Charles Antoine Lemaire, in the 10th issue of L'Illustration Horticole, as Echeveria cymosa. The type locality is probably California, as the description simply states "Californie? Třes distincte!" As there was no authentic type specimen, the neotype for the species is an illustration by John Gilbert Baker of Cotyledon cymosa in Refugio Botanicum.

In their work on North American Crassulaceae, Nathaniel Lord Britton and Joseph Nelson Rose placed Echeveria cymosa as Dudleya cymosa. With the recognition of infraspecific taxa, it became Dudleya cymosa subsp. cymosa. Reid Moran in the 1950s recognized a larger subspecies of Dudleya cymosa known as subsp. gigantea based on its larger size, but additional data proved this subspecies invalid, as the supposed larger size was not evident after numerous collections and data from cultivation.

Phylogenetics 
This plant is a diploid, with a chromosome number of n = 17, the base number for Dudleya. Phylogenetic analysis has placed this plant with the closely related to Dudleya cymosa subsp. paniculata and Dudleya abramsii subsp. setchellii. The other subspecies of Dudleya cymosa are not closely related.

Distribution and habitat 

This species is endemic to California. It is distributed throughout the California Coast Ranges, reaching a northern extent in Humboldt County, also distributed in the Sierra Nevada, and in the Santa Monica Mountains. It is found in rocky outcroppings, talus slopes, and shaded canyon slopes.

References 

cymosa subsp. cymosa
Natural history of the California Coast Ranges
Endemic flora of California
Natural history of the Santa Monica Mountains
Taxa named by Nathaniel Lord Britton
Taxa named by Joseph Nelson Rose
Flora without expected TNC conservation status